Recchia hirticornis is a species of beetle in the family Cerambycidae. It was described by Johann Christoph Friedrich Klug in 1825.

References

Recchia (beetle)
Beetles described in 1825